System 11 may refer to:

Computing
 Namco System 11, the arcade system board
 X Window System (or X11), a windowing system

Operating systems
 Android 11, the Google operating system
PDP-11 operating systems
RT-11, real-time operating system
RSX-11
DSM-11
BATCH-11/DOS-11
Ultrix-11
 Linux operating system distributive versions:
 Debian 11, the Debian Project distributive 
 Fedora 11, the RedHat-based distributive 
 Mandriva 11, the Mandriva distributive 
 Mint 11, the Ubuntu-based distributive 
 openSUSE 11, the openSUSE Project distributive 
 Ubuntu 11.4 and Ubuntu 11.10, the Canonical distributive (2011)
 Windows 11, the Microsoft operating system

Other
 STS-11 (Space Transportation System-11), a cancelled Space Shuttle mission
 Undecimal numbering system

See also
 OS 11